Bobrowniki  is a village in the administrative district of Gmina Sieradz, within Sieradz County, Łódź Voivodeship, in central Poland.

The village has an approximate population of 220.

References

Bobrowniki